162nd Division may refer to:

162nd Division (Israel)
162nd Motorized Infantry Division (People's Republic of China)
162nd Division (1st Formation)(People's Republic of China)
162nd Infantry Division (Wehrmacht)

Military units and formations disambiguation pages